Margie Tsang Wah Sin (born 6 August 1965) is a Hong Kong actress and TV programme host.

Career 
When Tsang was 17 years old in 1982, she took part in TVB's 12th annual artist training class. After she signed a contract with TVB, the company immediately listed her as an important actress to promote, according to Phoenix Television. She repeatedly appeared on the children's TV show 430 Space Shuttle and played Miu Yuek-lan in the TV series The Flying Fox of Snowy Mountain. Tsang acted in the TV series Police Cadet '85 and The Yang's Saga among many others.

Filmography
 The Flying Fox of Snowy Mountain (1985) (TV series) as Miu Yuek-lan
 Police Cadet '85 (1985) (TV series) as Yip How Yee
 Young Cops (1985)
 The Dragon Sword (1986)
 New Heavenly Sword and Dragon Sabre (1986) (TV series) as Kwok Seung (cameo)
 The Yang's Saga (1986) (TV miniseries) as To Kam-ngor
 The Grand Canal (1987)
 Scared Stiff (1987)
 How to Pick Girls Up! (1988)
 The Black Sabre (1989)
 Everybody loves somebody (1989)
 Beauty And The 7 Beasts (2007)
 D.I.E. (2008) (TV series) as Yue Chi-Ching 
 When A Dog Loves A Cat (2008) (TV series) as Shui Tin-Lan (Tina) 
 All's Well, Ends Well 2011 (2011) as Helen Cheng
 Eight Happiness 2012 (2012)

Personal life 
After Vocational education Shortly after signing with TVB, she began a relationship with Tony Leung Chiu-wai which later ended. In 1996, she married Lam Siu-Kei in London. They divorced in 2002. They gave birth to a child (Martin Lam) on January 1, 1999  in Sha Tin Union Hospital.

References

External links
 
 Margie Tsang at Hong Kong Cinemagic

Hong Kong television actresses
People from Bao'an County
Hong Kong people of Hakka descent
Indigenous inhabitants of the New Territories in Hong Kong
21st-century Hong Kong actresses
20th-century Hong Kong actresses
Hong Kong Buddhists
1965 births
Living people